Sir Robert Laidlaw KT (15 January 1856 – 3 November 1915) was a philanthropist, entrepreneur and British Liberal Party politician.

Biography
He was born on 13 January 1856, at Bonchester Bridge, Roxburghshire, the son of William Laidlaw and Agnes Purdom. He was educated at Kirkton and Denholm Parish Schools.

He married Mary Eliza, d/o Captain W. Blow Collins and widow of W. L. Francis, of the India Office in 1879, and had surviving issue, three daughters - Ethel, Mildred, and Dorothy. A son, William, died in infancy.

He died on 3 November 1917, aged 61, at his residence 13 St. Paul's Churchyard, London E.C. and lies buried at St. Luke's Cemetery, Bromley London, Borough of Bromley Greater London, England.

Career
Robert Laidlaw began his business life in Hawick, and in the course of a few years he joined the wholesale textile trade in London.

In the summer of 1875 he went to the South African Diamond Fields.

Having travelled extensively in Asia, Africa and America, Laidlaw came to India in 1877, and began a long residence in Calcutta (lasting for about 20 years), being an earnest member of the Thoburn Methodist Church (then known as the Dharmtolla Street Methodist Episcopal Church).

In the year 1882, in Calcutta, India, he founded the great business house "Whiteaway, Laidlaw, and Co.". Soon, Whiteaway opened branches in about 20 cities, in India and the Straits Settlements, including Shanghai, Singapore, Penang, Kuala Lumpur, Ipoh, Taiping, Seremban, Klang, Malacca and Telok Anson. Whiteaway was as much into tailoring and as they were into importing and selling household goods.  Robert Laidlaw was also a proprietor of tea estates in Darjeeling and of rubber estates in the Federated Malay States. He served as Chairman of Whiteaway, Laidlaw and Co. and Duncan Durian Rubber Estate, Ltd., till his death in 1917. He was also a director of the Pilot Insurance Corporation.

A great philanthropist, entrepreneur and visionary, Sir Robert Laidlaw sponsored and financed many educational institutions in India and overseas including The Calcutta Boys' School. He was a Fellow of the Royal Geographical Society, and a member of the Reform, National Liberal, and Glasgow Liberal Clubs.

In January 1906, standing for the first time, he was elected Liberal MP for Renfrewshire East, at the General Election, gaining the seat from the Conservatives.

In 1908 he was appointed British Commissioner to the International Opium Commission in Shanghai.

He was knighted in 1909 and was admitted to the Most Ancient and Most Noble Order of the Thistle (an order of chivalry associated with Scotland).

He was defeated at the General Election of January 1910 and did not seek election again.

He was elected the President of the World Sunday School Association, an office which he held till his death in 1917.

Election results

References

Sources
Who Was Who
British parliamentary election results 1885–1918, Craig, F. W. S.

External links 
 
 Biography at the Chislehurst Society; http://www.chislehurst-society.org.uk/Pages/About/People/Laidlaw_Robert.html

1856 births
1915 deaths
Members of the Parliament of the United Kingdom for Scottish constituencies
UK MPs 1906–1910
Scottish Liberal Party MPs